The 3rd Vancouver Film Critics Circle Awards, honoring the best in filmmaking in 2002, were given on 30 January 2003.

Winners

International
Best Actor:
Daniel Day-Lewis - Gangs of New York
Best Actress:
Julianne Moore - Far from Heaven
Best Director:
Stephen Daldry - The Hours
Best Film: 
The Hours
Best Foreign Language Film:
Hable con ella (Talk to Her), Spain
Best Supporting Actor:
Chris Cooper - Adaptation.
Best Supporting Actress:
Toni Collette - The Hours

Canadian
Best Actor:
Callum Keith Rennie - Flower & Garnet
Best Actress:
Sonja Bennett - Punch
Best Director:
Keith Behrman - Flower & Garnet
Best Film: 
Flower & Garnet
Best Supporting Actor:
Benjamin Ratner - Looking for Leonard
Best Supporting Actress:
Meredith McGeachie - Punch

References

2002
2002 film awards
2002 in British Columbia
2002 in Canadian cinema